Maya is a 2001 Hindi film directed by Digvijay Singh with Nitya Shetty, Mita Vashisht, Anant Nag and Nikhil Yadav in lead roles.

Plot
Sanjay (Nikhil Yadav) and his cousin Maya (Nitya Shetty) are carefree 12-year-old village kids.  They spend their days creating trouble, as kids will, throwing rocks and stealing sweets.  They are gently scolded, but clearly loved, by Sanjay's mother (Mita Vasisht) and father (Anant Nag).  Their life is idyllic and warm.

But when Maya reaches puberty and has her first period, everything changes in the space of just a few days.  The family heads to the neighboring village of Maya's parents to prepare for a mysterious ritual rape ceremony marking Maya's transition to womanhood.  Maya, who only dimly understands what happening to her, is told that she is no longer a child, and discouraged from her familiar play with Sanjay.  Sanjay, with even less understanding, chafes against the separation from his playmate and acts out, angering his father.  Then, when the day of the ritual arrives, over the terrified protests of Sanjay, Maya is subjected to a trauma of ritual rape in the temple that is truly shocking and horrible.

Cast
Anant Nag as Arun 
Mita Vasisht as Lakshmi 
Nitya Shetty as Maya
Nikhil Yadav as Sanjay 
Veerendra Saxena as Priest
Mukesh Bhatt as Ganesh 
Shilpa Navalkar as Mridu 
Shreechand Makhija as Candyman

Reception
The Film won international acclaim at the major film festivals it participated in. The music score by the America-based duo of Manesh Judge and Noor Lodhi won Critics Mention at the Flanders Film Festival in Belgium. The music also received an award in England and came in third behind John Williams' score for Star Wars: Episode III – Revenge of the Sith, and Leonardo DiCaprio's Catch me if you Can. The movie was first runners-up in People's Choice Award at the Toronto Film Festival, one spot ahead of Mira Nair's well known hit, Monsoon Wedding.

Toronto International Film Festival 2001 | 1st Runner-Up People's Choice Award
Montreal World Film Festival | Nominated - Grand Prix De Amerique
Flanders International Film Festival | Nominated Golden Spur and Winner Critics Mention - Music
Chicago International Film Festival | Critics Special Mention - Nitya Shetty & Nikhal Yadav
25th Asian American International Film Festival | Remy Martin Emerging Director of 2002  
Australian Cinematography Society | GOLD Award & Distinction for Cinematography

External links 
 Review at DVDTalk
 
 Kundalini Pictures

References 

2001 drama films
2001 films
Films about women in India
Films about rape in India
2000s Hindi-language films
Indian coming-of-age drama films
2000s coming-of-age drama films
Hindi-language drama films